David Emmanuel Paymer (born August 30, 1954) is an American actor, comedian, and television director. He has been in films such as Mr. Saturday Night, Quiz Show, Searching for Bobby Fischer, City Slickers, Crazy People, State and Main, Payback, Get Shorty, Carpool, The American President, The Hurricane, Ocean's Thirteen, and Drag Me to Hell. He was nominated for an Academy Award for Best Supporting Actor in 1992 for Mr. Saturday Night. He played the lead role as the Boss in Bartleby, an adaptation of Herman Melville's "Bartleby, the Scrivener." He played a mob boss in the television series Line of Fire.

Early life
Paymer was born in Oceanside, New York, the son of Sylvia, a travel agent, and Marvin Paymer, a pianist and musical director who originally worked in the scrap metal business. They divorced in 1973. Paymer is Jewish; his mother was born in Belgium and left for the United States to escape the Nazi occupation. Paymer has a brother, Steve, and graduated from the University of Michigan with a BA in theater and psychology. He is married to Liz Georges; they have two children.

Career
Paymer's acting career began in 1979 with the film The In-Laws. He has appeared in over 90 films in his career. He has also appeared in many popular television shows, including Taxi, Happy Days, L.A. Law, Cheers, Ghost Whisperer, Law & Order: Special Victims Unit , Entourage , Diff'rent Strokes and Family Ties. He has had recurring roles on Cheers, Murphy Brown, and The Larry Sanders Show. He has also appeared in such films as Amistad, City Hall, RFK, and Into the West. He received an Academy Award nomination for Mr. Saturday Night. His voice-over work includes Sheldon in the Kids' WB cartoon series Channel Umptee-3, and neurotic Welsh Terrier Mel in Balto 3: Wings of Change.

Paymer has directed episodes of several popular television series, including Gilmore Girls, Grey's Anatomy, One Tree Hill, Melrose Place, Everwood, Brothers & Sisters and Bunheads. He did a cameo appearance in an AT&T commercial in 2011. Also in Kids from Fame song Hi Fidelity.

Theater
He has appeared on the stage. In 2022 Paymer reprised his Mr. Saturday Night role thirty years later, appearing in the musical adaptation.

Filmography

Film

Television

Director

References

External links

1954 births
Living people
Male actors from New York (state)
American male voice actors
American male film actors
American male television actors
American television directors
American people of Belgian-Jewish descent
Jewish American male actors
Lee Strasberg Theatre and Film Institute alumni
People from Oceanside, New York
University of Michigan alumni
20th-century American male actors
21st-century American male actors
21st-century American Jews